Hazel is a town in Hamlin County, South Dakota, United States. It is part of the Watertown, South Dakota Micropolitan Statistical Area. The population was 102 at the 2020 census.

The town is named for Hazel Bowley, the daughter of the original owner of the town site.

Geography

Hazel is located at  (44.758926, -97.380800).

Hazel has been assigned the ZIP code 57242 and the FIPS place code 27940.

Demographics

2010 census
As of the census of 2010, there were 91 people, 36 households, and 21 families residing in the town. The racial makeup of the town was 97.8% White and 2.2% from two or more races.

There were 36 households, of which 30.6% had children under the age of 18 living with them, 55.6% were married couples living together, 2.8% had a female householder with no husband present, and 41.7% were non-families. 30.6% of all households were made up of individuals, and 13.9% had someone living alone who was 65 years of age or older. The average household size was 2.53 and the average family size was 3.43.

The median age in the town was 31.5 years. 31.9% of residents were under the age of 18; 12.1% were between the ages of 18 and 24; 17.6% were from 25 to 44; 17.6% were from 45 to 64; and 20.9% were 65 years of age or older. The gender makeup of the town was 53.8% male and 46.2% female.

2000 census
As of the census of 2000, there were 105 people, 41 households, and 30 families residing in the town. The population density was 429.3 people per square mile (168.9/km2). There were 44 housing units at an average density of 179.9 per square mile (70.8/km2). The racial makeup of the town was 98.10% White and 1.90% Native American. Hispanic or Latino of any race were 0.95% of the population. 34.0% were of American, 34.0% German, 11.3% Norwegian and 5.7% English ancestry according to Census 2000.

There were 41 households, out of which 29.3% had children under the age of 18 living with them, 61.0% were married couples living together, 9.8% had a female householder with no husband present, and 26.8% were non-families. 26.8% of all households were made up of individuals, and 17.1% had someone living alone who was 65 years of age or older. The average household size was 2.56 and the average family size was 3.07.

In the town, the population was spread out, with 29.5% under the age of 18, 8.6% from 18 to 24, 21.9% from 25 to 44, 11.4% from 45 to 64, and 28.6% who were 65 years of age or older. The median age was 36 years. For every 100 females, there were 94.4 males. For every 100 females age 18 and over, there were 89.7 males.

The median income for a household in the town was $23,000, and the median income for a family was $23,750. Males had a median income of $31,250 versus $16,500 for females. The per capita income for the town was $15,035. There were 16.7% of families and 22.2% of the population living below the poverty line, including 71.4% of under eighteens and none of those over 64.

Notable person
 Warren Green (1869-1945), 13th governor of South Dakota

References

Towns in Hamlin County, South Dakota
Towns in South Dakota
Watertown, South Dakota micropolitan area